The San Pellegrino University Foundation (also referred to as FUSP or San Pellegrino) was established in 2010. It owes its academic heritage to the Servite Order which in 1973 founded the Liceo Linguistico San Pellegrino (the San Pellegrino High School specialising in foreign languages) and in 1987 founded the Scuola Superiore per Interpreti e Traduttori (School for Translators and Interpreters).

Founding members of FUSP are the Order of the Servants of Mary, the Municipality of Misano Adriatico and the Nida Institute for Biblical Scholarship of New York. New partners include the Gruppo Maggioli (since 2014) and Uniformazione Vicenza (since 2013).

Academics 

FUSP offers an undergraduate program in Cultural Mediation at the Scuola Superiore per Mediatori Linguistici (SSML) in Misano Adriatico.

The degree program operates on a semester academic calendar with Fall semester running from October to December and Spring semester running from mid-February to early-May. The program focuses on perfecting one’s language skills through the acquisition of translation and interpreting skills. All alumni must take English as their first language and can then add up to two languages to their curriculum, choosing from Russian, Spanish, German, French, Chinese, Brazilian Portuguese and Arabic. Core modules also include General Linguistics, Italian Linguistics, Translation Theory, Elements of Economics, Geography and Law. There is an entry level writing test in English and Italian prior to enrolment (end of September). Exam sessions take place in January, May–June and September–October.

Since 1987, SSML has actively participated in the Erasmus Programme, the EU student exchange programme which enables students attending SSML to study abroad at its partner universities and/or work for partner companies in the European Union whilst receiving a bursary.

In 2014, FUSP inaugurated a separate branch of SSML located in the South of Italy, in Fasano (Brindisi), and in 2013 the SSML of Vicenza in the North also joined the Foundation, thus consolidating the Foundation’s presence across Italy.

Professional programs and advanced training 

In 2010, FUSP opened Traduzione Editoria, its Translation and Publishing Department which organises professional courses and advanced training for editorial translators. Its most popular programs are:

Master di Tradurre la Letteratura (the "Translating Literature" Advanced Training course): this advanced training program has been running for 20 years (so prior to the establishment of the Foundation) and in 2015 it will celebrate its 20th edition. This course is composed of two parallel activities: translation workshops and seminars given by professional translators and key figures of the publishing industry. The seminars focus on specific topics which range from literature for young adults to graphic novels, romance novels to historical fiction.
Avviamento all’interpretazione simultanea e consecutiva (Introduction to Simultaneous and Consecutive Interpreting), a course for aspiring interpreters wishing to learn the techniques of the trade or interpreters who wish to consolidate the skills they have already acquired.
Master traduzione editoriale–letteraria dall’arabo (Advanced training course in literary-editorial translation from Arabic into Italian)

Research 

Research has always been a pivotal activity at San Pellegrino and FUSP is currently conducting extensive research in the field of translation and is specifically involved in these projects:

The Nida School of Translation Studies (NSTS) is a two-week event which takes place in Misano in May every year. Now in its ninth edition, this important research gathering provides post-doctoral scholars, along with a limited number of advanced doctoral students, with an intense program of lectures, workshops, readings and tutorials, bringing together experts from around the world to critically explore various aspects of translation theory, linguistics, semiotics and cultural studies.
PETRA (Platforme Européenne pour la traduction littéraire) – FUSP is one of the Project Partners of a European-Union funded research project (2014-2016) for the creation of a European platform for translation. The aims of the project are to create open structures, at national and European level, to enable universities and higher education establishments to collaborate with non-academic organizations and associations and networks of professional literary translators without cumbersome administrative procedures, and to start a discussion on promising, long-term structures for the education and training of literary translators at a European level. This involves exchange and cooperation between academic and non-academic institutions on the contents of training, on practical issues and methods of teaching.
The fellow PETRA Project Partners are: Universiteit Utrecht (UU) – Faculty of Humanities, Katholieke Universiteit Leuven (KU LEUVEN) – Faculty of Arts, Nederlandse Taalunie /The Dutch Language Union (NTU), Eötvös Loránd University (ELTE) – Department of Dutch Studies, British Centre for Literary Translation (BCLT) – University of East Anglia (UEA), Deutscher Übersetzerfonds (DÜF), Conseil Européen des Associations de Traducteurs Littéraires (CEATL).
"Translation: an interdisciplinary journal" is an international peer-reviewed journal, which from January 2012 is published twice a year in print and online versions. The journal takes as its main mission the collection and representation of the ways in which translation as a fundamental element of culture transforms our contemporary world. Its ambition is to create a forum for the discussion of translation, offering an open space for debate and reflection on what is referred to as post-translation studies, moving beyond disciplinary boundaries towards wider transdisciplinary discourses on the translational nature of societies which are increasingly hybrid, diasporic, border-crossing, intercultural, multilingual, and global.
FUSP is also the venue for the Nida School of Biblical Translation (NSBT) which brings together biblical translators from all over the world in May every year.

Notable guests 

Professors, academics, scholars and translators who are or have been associated to San Pellegrino or its projects since 1987:

Davide Rondoni
Tomás Albaladejo
Camilo Rubén Fernández Cozman
Stefano Arduini
Susan Bassnett
Peeter Torop
Edwin Gentzler
Vicente L. Rafael
Eugene A. Nida
Sandra L. Bermann
Anthony Pym
Lawrence Venuti
Giuseppe Ragazzini
Ilide Carmignani
Elsa Támez
Beatrice Masini
Emanuelle Caillat
Daniele Brolli

Additional activities 

Every year the Foundation organises important competitions and events which attract interest on a local, regional and national level:

Premio Fondazione San Pellegrino per la Traduzione (Translation Competition for High School students): this annual competition has been taking place since 2012. It is open to all 5th year students from public or private high schools in the provinces of Rimini (RN), Pesaro (PU), Ravenna (RA) and Forlì-Cesena (FC) and involves translating a text from English, French, Spanish or German into Italian. The competition takes place in April every year; the best translators and runners up receive prizes at the award ceremony in May.
Premio San Pellegrino "Looking for Talent" ("Looking for Talent" Language Competition for Middle School Students): this annual competition, which has been taking place since 2013, tests the English language skills of 3rd year middle school students (12-13 year olds). Pupils from public or private middle schools in the provinces of Rimini (RN) and Pesaro (PU) can take part. The competition takes places in November every year; the best candidates and runners up receive prizes at the award ceremony in December.
Le Giornate della Traduzione Letteraria (The Literary Translation Days): the Literary Translation Days take place every year in late September - early October in the historic city of Urbino. This event, which has been running since 2003, is organised by FUSP in collaboration with the International Studies Department of History, Language and Culture at the "Carlo Bo" University. The Literary Translation Days are three days of seminars and debates held by writers, scholars, translators and publishers who analyse current issues and future horizons of the translation trade. In addition, two prizes are handed out during the event: the Zanichelli award and Harlequin Mondadori award. The former celebrates the career of a translator or person who has contributed significantly to the translator industry (previous award winners include Daniel Pennac and Luis Sepúlveda); the latter awards one of the participants of the event who is given the chance to translate a chapter from a romance novel from English into Italian.
The New York Symposium Each fall since 2011, the Nida School of Translation Studies has convened a high-level research symposium in New York City, seeking to bring into dialogue varied perspectives on an established theme in translation. At each gathering, two preeminent authorities in the field present their research and observations; two equally distinguished scholars are invited to respond. From September 2015, FUSP will be responsible for the organisation of this high-profile event.

External links

References 

2010 establishments in Italy
Educational institutions established in 2010
Translation and interpreting schools